Antonio Juan Fargas (born August 14, 1946) is an American actor known for his roles in 1970s blaxploitation and comedy movies, as well as his portrayal as Huggy Bear in the 1970s TV series Starsky & Hutch.

Early life
Fargas was born in New York City to Mildred (née Bailey) and Manuel Fargas; he was one of 11 children. His father was a Puerto Rican who worked for the City of New York. His mother was from Trinidad and Tobago. Raised in New York's Spanish Harlem, Fargas graduated from Fashion Industries High School in 1965.

Acting career
Fargas' breakout role was in the comedy film Putney Swope (1969). After starring in a string of blaxploitation movies in the early 1970s, such as Across 110th Street (1972) and Foxy Brown (1974), he gained recognition as streetwise informant Huggy Bear in the television series Starsky & Hutch. He appeared in All My Children beginning in 1982 as Les Baxter, the upper-class lawyer who was the father of Angie Hubbard; he would be killed off the series in 1987.

As a nod to his early roles, Fargas had a part in the blaxploitation spoof I'm Gonna Git You Sucka (1988) as well as another Wayans brothers "hood" parody, Don't Be a Menace (1996). He guest-starred in the mid-1990s sitcoms Living Single, Martin, The Fresh Prince of Bel-Air and The Steve Harvey Show. Fargas played the driver in the 1997 music video for the Backstreet Boys hit "Everybody (Backstreet's Back)".

Some of Fargas' notable appearances on British television shows include Series 4 of the reality series I'm a Celebrity...Get Me Out of Here! in 2004 and Frank Sidebottom's Proper Telly Show in early 2006. He played the part of Toledo in a revival of August Wilson's Ma Rainey's Black Bottom at the Royal Exchange Theatre in Manchester in 2006. He had a regular role as Doc on the 2005–2009 television series Everybody Hates Chris.

In 2008, Fargas acted in the British boxing film Sucker Punch. He appeared in an episode of Fox's Lie to Me as the father of a murdered firefighter.

Personal life
Fargas' son Justin Fargas, a University of Southern California alumnus, is a former NFL running back who played seven seasons for the Oakland Raiders, amassing over 3,000 rushing yards in his career. Fargas's daughter-in-law is former LSU women's basketball coach Nikki Caldwell.

Filmography

Film

Television

References

External links 

 Official Website
 

1946 births
Living people
20th-century American male actors
21st-century American male actors
American male film actors
American male television actors
American people of Puerto Rican descent
American people of Trinidad and Tobago descent
Male actors from New York City
I'm a Celebrity...Get Me Out of Here! (British TV series) participants